Paraceltites is a genus of ammonoid cephalopods in the ceratitid family Paraceltitidae, known from the Middle and Upper Permian of Sicily, the Alps, Crimea, Texas and Mexico.  The shell of Paraceltities is evolute with whorls compressed, venter arched and smooth, sides bearing ribs that slant somewhat forward dorso-ventrally.  The suture is simple and goniatitic.

Paraceltities was named by Gemmellaro, 1887. The type species is Paraceltities hoeferi.

References

 Treatise on Invertebrate Paleontology (1957) p. L131-132; R.C Moore (ed).  Geological Society of America and Univ. Kansas Press.
 The Paleobiology Database Paraceltites entry
 GONIAT-online Paraceltites entry

Paraceltitidae
Ceratitida genera
Permian ammonites
Ammonites of North America
Guadalupian first appearances
Lopingian genus extinctions
Paleozoic life of British Columbia